The Decoration of the Federal Agency for Technical Relief is a German decoration founded in 1975. It is awarded by the  Technisches Hilfswerk (THW) and is approved by the President of Germany.

History 
The silver and gold classes were established in 1975. The third class - a medal in bronze - was added in 1990. All classes are awarded for meritorious service in the THW or exemplary achievements in the field of emergency management or civil protection.

Prior to 1975, only internal awards of THW existed. Those did not have the approval of the President of Germany and could not be worn on uniforms of the Bundeswehr or Bundespolizei. They have a tradition that dates back to the early days of the THW in the 1950s. The THW-Helferzeichen in Gold and THW-Helferzeichen in Gold mit Kranz are still awarded today but they rank below the Decoration of the Federal Agency for Technical Relief.

Classes 
The Decoration of the Federal Agency for Technical Relief is awarded in three classes:
 Medal in bronze: max. 180 members of the THW and 25 others per year
 Cross in silver:max. 90 members of the THW and 15 others per year
 Cross in Gold:max. 15 members of the THW and 5 others per year

References

Orders
Civil awards and decorations of Germany